These are things named after Ferdinand Georg Frobenius, a German mathematician.
Arithmetic and geometric Frobenius
Cauchy–Frobenius lemma
Frobenioid
Frobenius algebra
Frobenius category
Frobenius coin problem
Frobenius number
Frobenius companion matrix
Frobenius covariant
Frobenius element
Frobenius endomorphism (also known as Frobenius morphism, Frobenius map)
Frobenius determinant theorem
Frobenius formula
Frobenius group
Frobenius complement
Frobenius kernel
Frobenius inner product
Frobenius norm
Frobenius manifold
Frobenius matrix
Frobenius method
Frobenius normal form
Frobenius polynomial
Frobenius pseudoprime
Frobenius reciprocity
Frobenius solution to the hypergeometric equation
Frobenius splitting
Frobenius theorem (differential topology)
Frobenius theorem (real division algebras)
Frobenius's theorem (group theory)
Frobenius conjecture 
Frobenius–Schur indicator
Perron–Frobenius theorem
Quadratic Frobenius test
Rouché–Frobenius theorem
Quasi-Frobenius Lie algebra
Quasi-Frobenius ring

Frobenius